Helen Jane Waddell (31 May 1889 – 5 March 1965) was an Irish poet, translator and playwright. She was a recipient of the Benson Medal.

Biography
She was born in Tokyo, the tenth and youngest child of Hugh Waddell, a Presbyterian minister and missionary who was lecturing in the Imperial University. She spent the first eleven years of her life in Japan before her family returned to Belfast.  Her mother died shortly afterwards, and her father remarried.  Hugh Waddell himself died and left his younger children in the care of their stepmother.  Following the marriage of her elder sister Meg, Helen was left at home to care for Mrs Waddell, whose health was deteriorating.

Waddell was educated at Victoria College for Girls and Queen's University Belfast, where she studied under Professor Gregory Smith, graduating in 1911. She followed her BA with first class honours in English with a master's degree, and in 1919 enrolled in Somerville College, Oxford, to study for her doctorate. A travelling scholarship from Lady Margaret Hall in 1923 allowed her to conduct research in Paris. It was at this time that she met her life-long friend, Maude Clarke.

She is best known for bringing to light the history of the medieval goliards in her 1927 book The Wandering Scholars, and translating their Latin poetry in the companion volume Medieval Latin Lyrics. A second anthology, More Latin Lyrics, was compiled in the 1940s but not published until after her death. Her other works range widely in subject matter. For example, she also wrote plays. Her first play was The Spoiled Buddha, which was performed at the Opera House, Belfast, by the Ulster Literary Society. Her The Abbe Prevost was staged in 1935. Her historical novel Peter Abelard was published in 1933. It was critically well received and became a bestseller.

She also wrote many articles for the Evening Standard, the Manchester Guardian and The Nation, and did lecturing and broadcasting.

Waddell was the assistant editor of The Nineteenth Century magazine. Among her circle of friends in London, where she was vice-president of the Irish Literary Society, were W. B. Yeats, Virginia Woolf, Rose Macaulay, Max Beerbohm and George William Russell.  Her personal and professional friendship with Siegfried Sassoon apparently made the latter's wife suspicious. Although she never married, she had close relationships with several older men, including her publisher, Otto Kyllmann of Constable.

Waddell received honorary degrees from Columbia, Belfast, Durham and St. Andrews and won the Benson Medal of the Royal Society of Literature.

A serious debilitating neurological disease put an end to her writing career in 1950. She died in London in 1965 and was buried in Magherally churchyard, County Down, Northern Ireland. A prize-winning biography of her by the Benedictine nun Dame Felicitas Corrigan was published in 1986.

Representative works

Novels
 Peter Abelard (1933)

Plays
The Spoiled Buddha (performed 1915; London: T. Fisher Unwin 1919)
The Abbé Prévost (London: Constable 1933).

Other
 Lyrics from the Chinese (1913)
 The Wandering Scholars (1927)
 Medieval Latin Lyrics (1929)
 Beasts and Saints (1934)
 The Desert Fathers (1936)
 For Better Factory Laws (1937) Pamphlet
 Poetry in the Dark Ages (1947) "The eighth W.P.Ker Memorial Lecture delivered in the University of Glasgow, 28th October, 1947" (lecture published by Jackson, Son & Company, Publishers to the University, 1948)
 Stories from Holy Writ (1949)
 More Latin Lyrics: From Virgil to Milton (posthumous, edited by Dame Felicitas Corrigan, 1976)
 Between Two Eternities (1993) (posthumous, edited by Dame Felicitas Corrigan.)

References

Further reading

External links 
 Helen Waddell at the Oxford Dictionary of National Biography  
 Short biography and "blue plaque" at the Ulster History Circle (archived 2011-06-05)
 Famous Faces from Belfast at Belfast Safaris – short biographies of Waddell and others (archived 2006-10-11)
 
 
 Helen Waddell: Poems at Black Cat Poems
 Helen Waddell entry in the Banbridge District Online by Banbridge District Council
 Helen Waddell papers at the Genesis Project in the UK
 
 Helen Waddell Papers at Queen's University Belfast
 

1889 births
1965 deaths
British medievalists
Women medievalists
Irish medievalists
Women poets from Northern Ireland
20th-century poets from Northern Ireland
20th-century British women writers
Corresponding Fellows of the Medieval Academy of America
Alumni of Somerville College, Oxford
British women historians